Lola is a 1981 West German drama film directed by Rainer Werner Fassbinder, the third in his BRD Trilogy, following The Marriage of Maria Braun (1978) and Veronika Voss (1982). It is a loose adaptation of Heinrich Mann's Professor Unrat (1905), which had previously been adapted for Josef von Sternberg's The Blue Angel (1930).

Plot
In 1957, in the town of Coburg, as in most of West Germany, reconstruction is the watchword, and Coburg's élite all benefit: the mayor, the police chief, the bank president, the newspaper editor and above all, Schuckert, a property developer who owns the brothel the other men frequent. His favourite employee is its singer, Lola.

This cosy arrangement is threatened by the arrival of the high-minded and cultured von Bohm, a refugee from East Prussia, as the new building commissioner. Divorced, he hires a woman with a young granddaughter as his housekeeper and devotes himself to his new job. One day, while he is out at work, his housekeeper shows her daughter his house. It is Lola, who decides she wants to know this interesting man and soon attracts his attention under her real name, Marie-Luise. Unaware of her night job or that Schuckert is her daughter's father, von Bohm proposes to her, but she warns him off. When he is finally taken to the brothel, he discovers the truth about her.

In the meantime von Bohm has been collecting evidence of Coburg's widespread corruption, including building permits masterminded by Schuckert, and decides to put a stop to it, but nobody is interested. Unable to change the system, and still in love with Lola, he marries her with Schuckert's blessing. As a wedding gift, Schuckert gives the pair the deed to the brothel and, while von Bohm is taking a walk after the church ceremony, takes the bride to bed.

Cast

References

External links
 
 
 The Candy-Colored Amorality of the Fifties: Lola Production History an essay by Michael Töteberg at the Criterion Collection

1981 films
1981 drama films
Adultery in films
Films about prostitution in Germany
Films about singers
Films directed by Rainer Werner Fassbinder
Films produced by Horst Wendlandt
Films set in 1957
Films set in 1958
Films set in Bavaria
Films set in West Germany
German drama films
1980s German-language films
West German films
1980s German films